Austropeplea tomentosa is a species of gastropod belonging to the family Lymnaeidae.

The species is found in Australia and New Zealand.

References

Lymnaeidae
Gastropods described in 1855
Freshwater molluscs of Oceania